Erechtites valerianifolius, common name tropical burnweed is a New World species of plants in the sunflower family. It is native to Mexico, Central America, South America, and the West Indies. It is also naturalized as a weed in much of the tropical Old World.

Description
Erechtites valerianifolius is an annual herb up to 100 cm (40 inches) tall. Leaves have long petioles with narrow wings along the sides, bearing oblong or elliptical blades with many pinnate lobes. One plant can produce many yellow or purple  flower heads, each with both disc florets and ray florets.

References

External links
photo of herbarium specimen at Missouri Botanical Garden in St. Louis, collected in Honduras in 1970
photo taken by Alfredo F. Fuentes showing close-up of flower heads of Erechtites valerianifolius
Flora de Santa Catarina (Brazil), Erechtites valerianifolius (Capiçova) in Portuguese with photos
Useful Tropical Plants, Erechtites valerianifolius Images photos

Senecioneae
Flora of North America
Flora of South America
Flora of the Caribbean
Plants described in 1826
Flora without expected TNC conservation status